Abdel Jabbar Bel Gnaoui (1 March 1942 – November 2016) was a Moroccan basketball player. He competed in the men's tournament at the 1968 Summer Olympics.

References

1942 births
2016 deaths
Moroccan men's basketball players
Olympic basketball players of Morocco
Basketball players at the 1968 Summer Olympics
Sportspeople from Rabat
20th-century Moroccan people